The gens Ofilia, also spelled Ofillia and Ofellia, was a plebeian family at ancient Rome.  Its most illustrious member was doubtless the jurist Aulus Ofilius, a friend of both Caesar and Cicero.

Origin
The nomen Ofilius first appears in history during the period of the Samnite Wars, both as a praenomen and a nomen among the Samnites, but by the first century BC individuals of this gens are found at Rome.  As a nomen, Ofilius may be regarded as a patronymic surname based on the existing praenomen, but Chase suggests a derivation from Ofella, a cognomen formed as a diminutive of offa, "a morsel".

Members
 Ofilius Calavius, a Campanian leader during the Samnite Wars, although in this case Ofilius appears to be his praenomen.
 Aulus Ofilius, an eminent jurist of the first century BC, with whom Caesar, Cicero, and Atticus were well-acquainted.  He was a pupil of Servius Sulpicius Rufus, and the tutor of Tubero, Capito, and Labeo.
 Ofillius, a military tribune serving under Octavian at the time of the mutiny of the soldiers in 36 BC.  Ofillius rejected Octavian's offers of military honours as a reward for service.  He subsequently disappeared.
 Marcus Ofilius Hilarus, an actor whose death was remarked upon by Pliny the Elder.  He expired at a birthday dinner, given by himself, so quickly and painlessly that some time elapsed before anyone discovered that he was dead.
 Ofellius, a philosopher mentioned by Arrian.
 Ofilius Macedo, one of the quindecimviri sacris faciundis in AD 204.
 Aulus Ofellius Macedo, a military tribune in the first legion, who subsequently became governor of Epirus, then of Bithynia and Pontus.
 Ofillius Maximus, patronus municipii of Terventum in Samnium.

See also
 List of Roman gentes

Footnotes

References

Bibliography

 Marcus Tullius Cicero, Epistulae ad Atticum, Epistulae ad Familiares.
 Titus Livius (Livy), History of Rome.
 Gaius Plinius Secundus (Pliny the Elder), Naturalis Historia (Natural History).
 Lucius Flavius Arrianus (Arrian of Nicomedia), Epicteti Diatribae (Discourses of Epictetus).
 Appianus Alexandrinus (Appian), Bellum Civile (The Civil War).
 Digesta seu Pandectae (The Digest).
 Guilielmus Grotius, De Vitae Jurisconsultorum (Lives of the Jurists), Felix Lopez, Lugdunum Batavorum (1690).
 Sigmund Wilhelm Zimmern, Geschichte des Römischen Privatrechts bis Justinian (History of Roman Private Law to Justinian), J. C. B. Mohr, Heidelberg (1826).
 Georg Friedrich Puchta, Cursus der Institutionen (Course of the Institutions), Breitkopf und Härtel, Leipzig (1841–1847).
 Dictionary of Greek and Roman Biography and Mythology, William Smith, ed., Little, Brown and Company, Boston (1849).
 Theodor Mommsen et alii, Corpus Inscriptionum Latinarum (The Body of Latin Inscriptions, abbreviated CIL), Berlin-Brandenburgische Akademie der Wissenschaften (1853–present).
 George Davis Chase, "The Origin of Roman Praenomina", in Harvard Studies in Classical Philology, vol. VIII (1897).
 Paul von Rohden, Elimar Klebs, & Hermann Dessau, Prosopographia Imperii Romani (The Prosopography of the Roman Empire, abbreviated PIR), Berlin (1898).
 T. Robert S. Broughton, The Magistrates of the Roman Republic, American Philological Association (1952).

 
Roman gentes of Samnite origin